Bark Lake is a lake on the border between the Township of Madawaska Valley in Renfrew County and the Township of South Algonquin, in Nipissing District in Ontario, Canada. It lies near Madawaska, Ontario on the Madawaska River where the tributary Opeongo River joins.

See also
List of lakes in Ontario

References

Government of Canada - Topographic Map sheet 031F05 - retrieved 2007-11-02 via Atlas of Canada

External links
 

Lakes of Nipissing District
Lakes of Renfrew County